Flushed is a 1999 American comedy film written, edited and directed by Carrie Ansell, and produced by Ken Greenblatt.

Plot
A series of comic vignettes that take place primarily in a nightclub women's and men's room.

References

External links

1999 comedy films
1999 films
American independent films
1999 directorial debut films
1990s English-language films
1990s American films